The individual dressage competition of the equestrian events at the 2015 Pan American Games took place July 11–14 at the Caledon Equestrian Park.

The first round of the individual dressage competition was the  FEI Prix St. Georges Test. The Prix St. Georges Test consists of a battery of required movements that each rider and horse pair performs. Five judges evaluate the pair, giving marks between 0 and 10 for each element. The judges' scores are averaged to give a final score for the pair.

The top 25 individual competitors in that round advanced to the individual-only competitions, though each nation is limited to three pairs advancing. This second round consisted of an Intermediare I Test, which is a higher degree of difficulty. The 15 best pairs in the Intermediare I Test advance to the final round. That round consists of, the Intermediare I Freestyle Test, competitors designe their own choreography set to music. Judges in that round evaluate the artistic merit of the performance and music as well as the technical aspects of the dressage. Final scores are based on the average of the Freestyle and Intermediare I Test results.

The top team not already qualified in the dressage team events qualified for the 2016 Summer Olympics in Rio de Janeiro, Brazil, along with the top two placed teams (not already qualified) in the show jumping competition. In the individual dressage competition, the top nation (not qualified in the team event) in groups IV and V will each qualify one quota. The top six athletes (not qualified in the team event) will also qualify for the show jumping competition.

Schedule
All times are Central Standard Time (UTC-6).

Results

Qualification

Final round

References

Equestrian at the 2015 Pan American Games